Richard Ray Roberts Jr. (born June 3, 1969) is an American retired professional football player.  He played nine seasons in the National Football League (NFL) as an offensive tackle.

Born and raised in Asheville, North Carolina, Roberts graduated from Asheville High School in 1987 and played college football for the Virginia Cavaliers, where he won the Jacobs Trophy in 1990 & 1991 as the ACC's top blocker.

After four seasons in Seattle, he finished his career with the Detroit Lions.

Following his playing career, Roberts returned to the Seattle area and was an assistant football coach at Interlake High School in Bellevue. He earned a master's degree in intercollegiate athletic leadership from the University of Washington in 2007. Roberts also worked as a diversity specialist at Microsoft and did local sports radio for the Seahawks. He became the head coach at Lake Washington High School in Kirkland in 2008, and resigned in June 2010 after posting consecutive  seasons.

In 2011, Roberts returned to his alma mater, the University of Virginia, in Charlottesville, to become the director of life skills for the Cavaliers football 

In 2015, Roberts moved back to Washington, where he worked at Rainier Scholars, a college enrichment program. Then in 2017, he left Rainier Scholars to work at Special Olympics where he currently works.

References

External links

Database Football.com - Ray Roberts

American football offensive tackles
Virginia Cavaliers football players
Seattle Seahawks players
Detroit Lions players
Players of American football from North Carolina
Sportspeople from Asheville, North Carolina
1969 births
Living people
Ed Block Courage Award recipients